The Simpsons shorts are a series of animated shorts that aired as a recurring segment on Fox variety television series The Tracey Ullman Show for three seasons, before the characters spun off into The Simpsons, their own half-hour prime-time show. They feature Homer, Marge, Bart, Lisa, and Maggie, and a few secondary characters. The series was created by Matt Groening, who designed the Simpson family and wrote many of the shorts. The shorts first aired on April 19, 1987 starting with "Good Night". The final short to air was "TV Simpsons", originally airing on May 14, 1989. The Simpsons later debuted on December 17, 1989, as an independent series with the Christmas special "Simpsons Roasting on an Open Fire".

One marketing study found that only 14 percent of Americans were familiar with the shorts, compared to 85 percent in November 1990 who were familiar with the Simpsons family, 11 months after the full-length show began airing.

Only a few of these shorts have been released on DVD. "Good Night" was included on The Simpsons Season 1 DVD. Five of these shorts were later used in the clip-show episode "The Simpsons 138th Episode Spectacular" on the half-hour show, which was released on the Season 7 DVD. These five shorts were "Good Night", which was featured in its entirety, and portions of "The Perfect Crime", "Space Patrol", "World War III", and "Bathtime". In "You Kent Always Say What You Want", the short "Family Portrait" replaces the entire opening sequence in celebration of the 400th episode. ("Family Portrait" was previously released as a pre-feature short on the 1989 CBS-Fox VHS release of the film Working Girl.) In June 2013, it was reported that FXX was trying to acquire the shorts for their Simpsons app, "Simpsons World".

The version of the Simpson family from the shorts was depicted as ghosts haunting the Simpsons house in the season twenty six episode "Treehouse of Horror XXV".

The short's interpretation of Homer was also briefly seen in Homer's dream in the post credits scene of the season 33 episode "Mothers and Other Strangers".

Development
When producer James L. Brooks was working on the television variety show The Tracey Ullman Show, he decided that he wanted to include short animated wraparounds before and after the commercial breaks. Having seen one of cartoonist Matt Groening's Life in Hell comic strips, Brooks asked Groening to pitch an idea for a series of animated shorts, which Groening initially intended to present as his Life in Hell series. Groening later realized that animating Life in Hell would require the rescinding of publication rights for his life's work. He therefore chose another approach while waiting in the lobby of Brooks's office for the pitch meeting, hurriedly formulating his version of a dysfunctional family that became the Simpsons. He named the characters after his own family members, substituting "Bart" for his own name. Bart was modeled after Groening's older brother, Mark, but given a different name which was chosen as an anagram of "brat". The stories were written and storyboarded by Matt Groening. The family was crudely drawn, because Groening had submitted basic sketches to the animators, assuming they would clean them up; instead, they just traced over his drawings. The animation was produced domestically at Klasky-Csupo, with Wesley Archer, David Silverman, and Bill Kopp being animators for the first season. After season one, it would be animated by Archer and Silverman thereafter. Gyorgyi Peluce was the colorist and the person who decided to make the characters yellow.

The actors who voiced the characters in the short later reprised their roles in The Simpsons series. Dan Castellaneta performed the voices of Homer Simpson, Grampa Simpson, and Krusty the Clown. Homer's voice sounds different in the shorts compared to most episodes of the half-hour show, as Castellaneta originally tried to impersonate Walter Matthau. Although he would retain this characteristic through the early episodes of the regular series, it was gradually dropped as Homer's personality evolved away from that of a stereotypical sitcom father. The producers of the show were in need of someone to do voiceovers, so rather than hire actors, they asked Castellaneta (who had already done some voice work) and Julie Kavner, both members of the Ullman Show cast, to do it. The kids still needed voices, and Nancy Cartwright, a journeyman voice actress, came in to audition. She recalled that "I was already doing voicework for eight different shows at the time and thought this would just be another job. They originally wanted me for Lisa's voice, but I thought 'Nah, I don't want to be the boring middle child, I want to be a bratty 10-year old boy.' So as soon as I gave a demonstration, [Brooks and Groening] hired me on the spot." Some time later, Yeardley Smith, a 22-year-old B-movie actress whose most notable accomplishment to date was featuring in the notorious 1986 Stephen King film Maximum Overdrive, was brought in to do Lisa's voice. The recording of the shorts was often primitive; according to Cartwright, the dialogue for the Ullman shorts was recorded on a portable tape deck in a makeshift studio, which consisted of the video engineer suite, above the bleachers on the Ullman show set. While most of the characters' personalities are similar to what they are in the series, Lisa is simply a clone of Bart and did not have a distinct personality until a few episodes into the regular series.

The shorts were featured on the first three seasons on The Tracey Ullman Show. By the fourth and last season of The Tracey Ullman Show, the first season of the half-hour show was on the air. In the two first seasons the shorts were divided into three or four parts, but in the third season they were played as a single story. Tracey Ullman later filed a lawsuit, claiming that her show was the source of The Simpsons' success and therefore should receive a share of the show's profit. Eventually the courts ruled in favor of the network.

Shorts

From season 1 (1987)

From season 2 (1987–88)

From season 3 (1988–89)

See also
 List of The Tracey Ullman Show episodes
 List of The Simpsons episodes
 "Treehouse of Horror XXV"

References

General

Specific

External links

Shorts
Comedy sketches
1987 introductions
Tracey Ullman
Television series by Klasky Csupo
1987 in American television
1988 in American television
1989 in American television